Viala-du-Tarn (literally Viala of the Tarn) is a commune in the Aveyron department in southern France.

The town of Le Viala dates from Medieval times and contains several interesting towers built in the 14th century. The administration of the Commune maintains a popular swimming beach and small boat access point on the Tarn.

One such tower is pictured at right. Owned by the patriarch of a prominent Anglo-Saxon family, it was renovated from 1985–present.

Population

See also
Communes of the Aveyron department

References

Communes of Aveyron
Aveyron communes articles needing translation from French Wikipedia